The 2016 FIM Cross-Country Rallies World Championship season is the 14th season of the FIM Cross-Country Rallies World Championship.

Calendar
The calendar for the 2016 season featured five rallies. Some of the rallies were also part of FIA Cross Country Rally World Cup.

Teams and riders

Results

Championship standings

Riders' championship

References

External links
 

FIM Cross-Country Rallies World Championship
Cross-Country Rallies World Championship